The 2007 Lenox Industrial Tools 300 was the 17th race of the 2007 NASCAR Nextel Cup Series season, held on July 1, 2007, at New Hampshire International Speedway in Loudon, New Hampshire.

Summary
The event served as the eighth race for the new Car of Tomorrow and its first race at NHIS.

Qualifying
Dave Blaney won the pole with a speed of 129.437 mph giving him his second career pole (last pole at North Carolina Speedway in February 2003)  and giving Toyota their first ever NEXTEL Cup pole position.

Shortly after the conclusion of qualifying the #83 Red Bull Toyota of Brian Vickers was found to be too low in post-qualifying inspection. Due to this his time was disallowed and he was dropped from the field.  Chad Chaffin, driver of the #49 car, took his place in the starting lineup.

Others who failed to qualify: Michael Waltrip (#55), A. J. Allmendinger (#84), Kenny Wallace (#78), Scott Riggs (#10), Dale Jarrett (#44)

Happy Hour
Jimmie Johnson led Happy Hour with a speed of 127.062 mph, while Martin Truex Jr. ran the most laps, 58. Top 5 times were as follows:

Race
Pole sitter Dave Blaney led the first 30 laps, the most laps he had led in a race since Atlanta in March 2001. However, he lost the lead to former New Hampshire winner Jeff Gordon. After a cycle of green-flag pit stops, Dale Earnhardt Jr. assumed the top spot and led the most laps at 64. Many pit problems arose for some teams, such as speeding penalties, or running over a hose in Ryan Newman's case, or having the jack drop off the racecar, as was witnessed by the 99 crew of Carl Edwards. However, the most significant pitstop of the day was the last one. Denny Hamlin's crew chief Mike Ford took a gamble, putting on two tires, thus giving his driver the lead. Hamlin managed to hold off a furious charge from Jeff Gordon to end his 32-race winless streak and put his team back in victory lane.

Results

"*" Denotes rookie

Race notes
Hendrick Motorsports crew chiefs Steve Letarte (#24) and Chad Knaus (#48) served the first of a six-race suspensions for the Car of Tomorrow violations found at Infineon Raceway the previous week.
Chaffin, who backed into the race when Vickers' qualifying time was wiped out, replaced Mike Bliss, who was released earlier in the week.

Post-race penalties
The #70 car of Johnny Sauter and the #5 car of Kyle Busch were found too low during post-race inspection.  As a result, both drivers lost 25 points in the standings, their respective owners (Haas CNC Racing and Hendrick Motorsports) lost 25 points as well, and their respective crew chiefs (Robert "Bootie" Barker and Alan Gustafson) were placed on probation until September 19.

External links
 Practice Speeds
 Qualifying Results

References 

Lenox Industrial Tools 300
Lenox Industrial Tools 300
NASCAR races at New Hampshire Motor Speedway
Lenox Industrial Tools 300